The following are the national records in athletics in Slovenia maintained by its national athletics federation: Atletska Zveza Slovenije (AZS).

Outdoor

Key to tables:

+ = en route to a longer distance

h = hand timing

Mx = mark was made in a mixed race

X = subsequently annulled for doping violation

Men

Women

Indoor

Men

Women

Notes

References
General
Slovenian National Records – Outdoor 4 January 2023 updated
Slovenian National Records – Indoor 15 January 2023 updated
Slovenian All Time Best Performances – Indoor 31 May 2020 updated
Specific

External links
 AZS web site

Slovenia
Records
Athletics
Athletics